Axel Johan Janse (18 March 1888 – 18 August 1973) was a Swedish gymnast. He was part of the Swedish team that won the gold medal in the Swedish system event at the 1912 Summer Olympics. He was also a military pilot, and a model for the sculpture Deliverer in Örebro.

References

1888 births
1973 deaths
Swedish male artistic gymnasts
Gymnasts at the 1912 Summer Olympics
Olympic gymnasts of Sweden
Olympic gold medalists for Sweden
Olympic medalists in gymnastics
Medalists at the 1912 Summer Olympics
People from Eskilstuna Municipality
Sportspeople from Södermanland County